Gigi Fernández and Conchita Martínez were the defending champions but they competed with different partners that year, Fernández with Natasha Zvereva and Martínez with Patricia Tarabini.

Fernández and Zvereva lost in the first round to Amy Frazier and Kimberly Po.

Martínez and Tarabini lost in the quarterfinals to Frazier and Po.

Martina Hingis and Arantxa Sánchez Vicario won in the final 6–3, 7–5 against Frazier and Po.

Seeds
Champion seeds are indicated in bold text while text in italics indicates the round in which those seeds were eliminated.

 Gigi Fernández /  Natasha Zvereva (first round)
 Martina Hingis /  Arantxa Sánchez Vicario (champions)
 Nicole Arendt /  Manon Bollegraf (first round)
 Larisa Savchenko /  Helena Suková (quarterfinals)

Draw

External links
 1997 Toshiba Classic Doubles draw

Southern California Open
1997 WTA Tour